Hao Wu is a Chinese American biochemist and crystallographer and the Asa and Patricia Springer Professor of Structural Biology in the Department of Biological Chemistry and Molecular Pharmacology at Harvard Medical School. Her work focuses on molecular mechanisms of signal transduction in cell death and inflammation. She is the discoverer of  signalosomes, which are large macromolecular complexes involved in cell death and in innate and adaptive immune pathways. She has established a new paradigm for signal transduction that involves higher-order protein assemblies. She has received the Pew Scholar Award, the Rita Allen Scholar Award, the Margaret Dayhoff Memorial Award, the NYC Mayor's Award for Excellence in Science and Technology, NIH MERIT and Pioneer Awards, and the Purdue University Distinguished Science Alumni Award. She was elected AAAS fellow in 2013 and to the National Academy of Sciences in 2015.

Early life and education 
Wu's parents were physics professors in Beijing, China. In high school, Wu was recognized as an academic talent and frequently chosen for competitions in math and physics. Her parents made diligent efforts to provide her with a rigorous education, even during the anti-intellectualism of the "Cultural Revolution." As a high school junior, Wu was selected to the Chinese preparatory camp for the International Mathematical Olympiad, but declined in order to attend a summer program in biology. Wu was admitted from high school to Peking Union Medical College (PUMC) with the highest entering grades in 1982. She received the first 3-year pre-medical education in this program at Peking University and then attended PUMC for clinical education. While at PUMC, she participated in laboratory research in immunology and became deeply fascinated by basic research. In 1987, Wu attended a scientific lecture on virus structure by Professor Michael Rossmann, a pioneer in X-ray crystallography who was visiting Beijing at the time. Instead of spending another two years to complete her M.D. degree, Wu resolved to come to the U.S. to pursue further scientific training. She entered the Ph.D. program in biochemistry at Purdue University in Indiana in 1988 under Professor Rossmann's supervision, graduating in 1992, and then moved to New York City to perform her postdoctoral work in Professor Wayne Hendrickson's laboratory at Columbia University.

Career 
Following her postdoctoral work, Wu started an independent laboratory as assistant professor in the Department of Biochemistry at Weill Cornell Medical College in 1997. She was promoted to associate professor in 2001 before becoming professor in 2003. In 2012, she was recruited to the Program in Cellular and Molecular Medicine at Boston Children's Hospital as the Asa and Patricia Springer Professor of Structural Biology in the Department of Biological Chemistry and Molecular Pharmacology at Harvard Medical School.

Research 
Wu's research focuses on understanding the molecular mechanisms involved in cell death and inflammation, mainly through the application of biochemical and biophysical methods. Her laboratory has determined the structures of numerous large protein complexes that play critically important roles in immune signaling, including structures of TRAFs, Myddosome and IKK-beta in Toll-like receptor signaling, the Inflammasome, gasdermins, and the synaptic recombination-activating gene (RAG) complexes. Based on these studies, she has advanced the concept of signal transduction as a process that is mediated by higher-order oligomer assembly, with ramifications that include proximity-driven enzyme activation, threshold behavior, signal amplification, reduction of biological noise, and temporal and spatial control of signal transduction.

References

External links 

 Wu's Boston Children's Hospital Homepage
 Cancer Research Institute Page

Living people
American women biochemists
Harvard Medical School faculty
Cornell University faculty
American women chemists
Chinese women chemists
Chinese chemists
American women biologists
Chinese women biologists
Chemists from Beijing
Peking Union Medical College alumni
Purdue University alumni
Members of the United States National Academy of Sciences
Fellows of the American Association for the Advancement of Science
Chinese emigrants to the United States
Year of birth missing (living people)
Educators from Beijing
Biologists from Beijing
American women academics
21st-century American women